Kerkiraikos, also called Rouga and Perdika, is a form of a Greek folk dance from the island of Corfu. The dance consist of 12 steps and has many similarities with the Greek dance Kalamatianos.

See also
Music of Greece
Greek dances

References
Ελληνικοί παραδοσιακοί χοροί (article in Greek)

Greek dances
Culture of Corfu